Sara Errani was the defending champion, but lost in the first round to Allie Kiick.

Viktorija Golubic won the title, defeating Jennifer Brady in the final, 3–6, 7–5, 6–3.

Seeds
All seeds received a bye into the second round.

Draw

Finals

Top half

Section 1

Section 2

Bottom half

Section 3

Section 4

Qualifying

Seeds

Qualifiers

Qualifying draw

First qualifier

Second qualifier

References

External links
Main Draw
Qualifying Draw

2019 WTA 125K series
2019 Women's Singles